Han Wo ( – ) was a Chinese poet of the late Tang dynasty and the Min state. His courtesy name was Zhiyao, or possibly Zhiguang or Zhiyuan, and his art name was Yushan-Qiaoren. He was a native of Jingzhao, in or near the capital Chang'an. An anthology of his poems, the Xianglian Ji survives.

Biography

Sources 
Chapter 183 of the New Book of Tang gives a short biography of Han Wo.

Birth and early life 
He was born in either 842 or 844. He was a native of Wannian, Jingzhao (modern-day Xi'an, Shaanxi Province). His father, Han Zhan took the imperial examination in the same year as Li Shangyin, who was also connected to Wo's family through marriage. The young Wo supposedly was recognized for his poetic genius by Li, who praised him.

Political career 
In 889 (Longji 1) he passed the imperial examination, receiving his Jinshi degree. He became a scholar at the Hanlin Academy and a low-ranking official at the Central Secretariat, eventually becoming Vice-Minister of Defense (兵部侍郎). He earned the trust of Emperor Zhaozong, working with him against the eunuchs, and was recommended for the position of chancellor, but he was disliked by Zhu Quanzhong (later to become Emperor Daizu of Liao) and was therefore exiled to Pu Prefecture (modern Fan County, Henan).

Later life and death 
Following his exile, Han did not return to government, and spent his last years in the Min Kingdom. He died around 923, having never returned to the capital.

Names

Courtesy name 
His courtesy name was either Zhiyao or Zhiguang, or possibly Zhiyuan.

The New Book of Tang, as well as a work by Han's contemporary , refer to him as Zhiguang, but the Liexian Zhuan associates the character used in his given name Wo with the second character of Zhiyao, lending support to the idea that Zhiguang would have fit his given name better. Both the Tang Cai Zi Zhuan and the Tangshi Jishi give his courtesy name as Zhiyao.

Art name 
His art name was Yushan-Qiaoren.

Poetry 
In literary history, Han is generally considered a poet of the so-called late Tang period, which spanned the early-ninth century to 907.

An anthology of his poems, the Xianglian Ji, survives. His poetry is noted for its sensual beauty, with the Xianglian Ji having given its name to xianglian-ti, a style of poetry associated with him. His poems of other types are collected in the Yushan-Qiaoren Ji.

Reception 
His poetry influenced the work of the fourteenth-century poet Yang Weizhen.

Notes

References

Works cited

Further reading

External links 
  Books of the Quan Tangshi at the Chinese Text Project that include collected poems of Han Wo:
 Book 680
 Book 681
 Book 682
 Book 683

840s births
920s deaths
Year of birth uncertain
Year of death uncertain
Tang dynasty poets
Writers from Xi'an
Poets from Shaanxi
9th-century Chinese poets
10th-century Chinese poets
Three Hundred Tang Poems poets
Min Kingdom people born during Tang